AIDS (aircraft integrated data system) is an aircraft system that allows the airline to record and/or monitor all available parameters which are on the aircraft buses. Some Aircraft like the Airbus A320 have an AIDS print button which, when programmed over the MCDU, allows paper data reports, DAR recordings, or ACARS transmissions of a select amount of parameters to be printed.

References

Aircraft recorders